Hillside Elementary School is a 50,302 ft2 former public elementary school in the hills of Berkeley, California, at 1581 Le Roy Avenue, bordered by Le Roy Avenue, Buena Vista Way, and La Loma Avenue. It is registered as a local historic landmark and is listed on the National Register of Historic Places.

History
Hillside first opened in the Fall of 1901 on the nearby southwest corner of Le Roy Avenue and Virginia Street.  This first Hillside, constructed under the auspices of the newly formed Hillside Club, for the Berkeley Public Schools, was one of the hundreds of structures that was destroyed by the 1923 Berkeley fire.  The school was temporarily relocated, from late 1923 until August 1926, to the University School (1414 Walnut Street) while a new school building was constructed.

The Berkeley School District built the present structure in 1925 on the site of several homes that were destroyed by the same fire that destroyed the original Hillside. It was designed by prominent Berkeley architect Walter H. Ratcliff.

A major seismic retrofit was made in the 1930s and an additional wing added in 1964-65.  The 1930s work included upgrades pursuant to the Field Act which resulted from the 1933 Long Beach earthquake.  The building is landmarked for the degree to which it is intact, along with the quality of both architectural design and construction.

In the late 1960s, Hillside became a primary school (K-3) as part of a district-wide re-organization. In 1982 it was added to the National Register of Historic Places (#82000961).

In 1983, the school district closed Hillside because of a declining school age population, and because it sits near or on the Hayward Fault.  The Berkeley Montessori School (since renamed The Berkeley School) and the Berkeley Chess School leased part of the site.

In 2012, the Berkeley Unified School District sold the school to the German International School of Silicon Valley (GISSV). GISSV replaced damaged walkways and entrance steps and removed a deteriorated temporary building that had been had been situated on the old Kindergarten playground since the early 1970s, and in early 2016, replaced the original slate shingles with new historically accurate slate shingles and also replaced the original copper gutters, which had been vandalized and stolen. The school used it for their Berkeley campus from August 2012 until December 2016, when they closed the building due to unmet seismic retrofit needs.  Diggings nearby show the fault may be braided in the area, and an active fault trace below the building cannot be ruled out.

In 2018, the German School sold the property to Finnish entrepreneur , who plans to use it for artist studios.

Area residents have used Hillside's playground as a de facto neighborhood park since it was constructed; a pedestrian path is heavily used. In 2009, with sale of the site to a housing developer pending, local residents proposed a special assessment district to fund purchase of the playground section of the site.

BUSD Principals
 Clara. G. Potwin, 1901-1907 (d.1907)
 Jeannette Barrows, 1907-1937 (d.1945)
 Eugenie E. Jackson, 1937-1943 
 Helen B. Maslin, 1943-1959 (d.1963)
 Theodore F. Blitz, 1959-1973 (d.1993)
 Frank L. Fisher, 1973-1978
 Kathryne L. Favors, 1978-1981 (d.2008)
 Marian K. Altman, 1981-1983

In film
Hillside stood in as an English mansion in the 2012 movie The Master.  Filming took place during June 2011.

See also
La Loma Park

References

 Directory of Berkeley Public Schools, Annual, 1918-
 Article: "Board Acts to Halt Sliding of Hillside School", Berkeley Daily Gazette, September 20, 1927.

External links 
 German International School of Silicon Valley, Berkeley Campus
 Berkeley Chess School
 Hillside Association of Berkeley
 Hillside Association of Berkeley
 Rehabilitation Scoping Guide

Buildings and structures in Berkeley, California
Education in Berkeley, California
Schools in Alameda County, California
Defunct schools in California
Parks in Berkeley, California
School buildings completed in 1925
National Register of Historic Places in Berkeley, California
School buildings on the National Register of Historic Places in California
Tudor Revival architecture in California
1925 establishments in California